The Haixun 01 is a Chinese patrol ship, with a length of 128.6 meters and a weight of 5418 tons. She was commissioned by the China Maritime Safety Administration in April 2013, for traffic patrolling, safety monitoring, oil spill detection and handling, salvage, search and rescue, deep sea towage and firefighting. The home port of the ship is Shanghai. Compared to the other ships in the CMSA fleet, it is responsible for cruise and emergency response beyond the waters 50 miles off the shore. China has ordered the build of four extra Haixun 01 identical ships.

History
The ship was launched 28 July 2012, and handed over to the China Maritime Safety Administration in late April 2013. It is the first in a new class of 5000 tons patrol ships, being completely fitted out for salvage, deep sea towage and firefighting. In January 2013, China ordered the build of four extra Haixun 01 identical ships. With a length above 100 meters, she belong to the biggest category of ships in the CMSA fleet, that are only tasked to answer the cruise and emergency response calls beyond the waters 50 miles off the shore.

Configuration and equipment
In case of emergencies it can accommodate 200 persons. The length of the ship is 128.6 meters, and the weight is 5418 tons. The home port of the ship is Shanghai. According to the head of the Shanghai Maritime Bureau, which will manage the ship, it is the first Chinese patrol ship to simultaneously incorporate marine inspection and rescue functions. It will carry out missions regarding both maritime inspection, safety monitoring, rescue, oil spill detection and handling. The ship also has a helipad.

Cruise operations
In March 2014, Haixun 01 was sent to participate in the search for the missing Malaysia Airlines Flight 370, off the west coast of Australia.

References

China Maritime Safety Administration ships
2012 ships
Vessels involved in the search for Malaysia Airlines Flight 370